Carabaya Province is a province of the Puno Region located in the southern part of Peru. It is bounded on the north by the Madre de Dios Region, on the east by the Sandia Province, on the south by the provinces of Azángaro, Melgar and Putina and on the west by the Cusco Region. The capital of the province is the city of Macusani.

Geography 
The province is traversed by the Willkanuta and Kallawaya mountain ranges. Some of the highest peaks of the province are Allin Qhapaq, Ch'ichi Qhapaq and Pumanuta. Other mountains are listed below:

Ariquma Lake, Wiluyuq Qucha and Sayt'uquta belong to the largest lakes of the province.

Political division 
The province measures  and is divided into ten districts:

Ethnic groups 
The people in the province are mainly indigenous citizens of Quechua descent. Quechua is the language which the majority of the population (84.12%) learnt to speak in childhood, 15.14% of the residents started speaking using the Spanish language and  0.62% Aymara (2007 Peru Census).

See also 
 Chawpiqucha
 Chichakuri
 Ch'uxñaquta
 Inambari River
 Kimsaqucha
 Parinaquta
 Saytuqucha (Coasa)
 Yawarmayu

References

External links 
  Official website

Provinces of the Puno Region